Pine Mountain, Georgia may refer to any of the following locations in the United States:
Pine Mountain, Harris County, Georgia, a town
Pine Mountain, Rabun County, Georgia, an unincorporated community
Pine Mountain Range, a long ridge in Harris, Meriwether, and Talbot counties
Pine Mountain (Bartow County, Georgia), a mountain in Cartersville, Georgia
Pine Mountain (Cobb County, Georgia), a small summit associated with the American Civil War